Lily Jovanka Pérez San Martín (born 10 May 1963) is a Chilean publicist and politician.

She served a councilor for La Florida from 1992 to 1996, a national deputy for District 26 from 1998 to 2006, a deputy for District 36 from 2008 to 2010, and a senator for Constituency 5 from 2010 to 2018. In addition, from 2014 to 2018 she was the president of the now-defunct Amplitude party.

Biography
Lilia Pérez was born in Santiago on 10 May 1963, the daughter of Samuel Manuel Pérez Baeza and Liliana Beatriz San Martín Zavala. She later changed her legal name to Lily.

She graduated as a publicist from the University of the Pacific, and earned a postgraduate degree in political philosophy at Gabriela Mistral University.

She is married to the lawyer . She has two children from her first marriage and five stepdaughters.

In the workplace, from 1993 to 1996, Pérez served as a member of the editorial committee of the newspaper La Nación.

She was the victim of a Neo-Nazi attack in Viña del Mar in 2010, escaping without serious injuries.

In March 2011, she suffered an attack of viral trigeminal neuralgia, which caused temporary facial paralysis. She received treatment at the Clínica Alemana de Santiago.

Political career

Councilor 
In 1992, Pérez was elected councilor for La Florida. In 1993, she joined the Renovación Nacional (RN) party, and became part of its political commission. She was the party's president of mayors and councilors until 1996. In 1996, she presented herself as a candidate for mayor or La Florida, but was not elected, and resigned as a councilor.

Deputy
Pérez was presented as a candidate for the Chamber of Deputies in the 1997 parliamentary election, for District 26, corresponding to the commune of La Florida. During her tenure, she was a member of the permanent commissions of interior government, regionalization, planning and social development, housing and urban development, and family. She also participated in the investigative commission of Casas Copeva, social housing located in the Puente Alto commune supplied by the Ministry of Housing and Urbanism (Minvu) that had serious construction problems.

She was reelected handily in the 2001 parliamentary election. On that occasion, she was a member of the permanent commissions of national defense, housing and urban development, foreign relations, interparliamentary affairs, and Latin American integration. She was also part of the special commission on actions by public officials in the "".

In 2005, Pérez was a candidate for senator for the Santiago Oriente constituency in that year's parliamentary election, but did not win a seat. In 2006, she was elected secretary general of RN, a position she held until the end of 2008, being replaced by Bruno Baranda.

On 2 October 2008, she became a deputy for District 38 for 16 months, replacing the late Pedro Álvarez-Salamanca. This time, she represented the Maule Region. During her tenure, she participated in the permanent commission on human rights, nationality, and citizenship.

Senator

In December 2009, she was elected senator on behalf of RN, for the Valparaíso Cordillera Region (Constituency 5) with the first majority within the Coalition for Change. She was a member of the housing and urban planning commissions, and presided over the commission on human rights, nationality, and citizenship.

In 2013, she became the spokesperson for presidential candidate Evelyn Matthei.

On 16 January 2014, she resigned from her membership in RN, accusing its board of directors, headed by Carlos Larraín, of "intolerance, classism, and personalism." Later that year, she joined the Amplitude political movement, and was elected president of its national board in June 2016.

She is a supporter of abortion on three grounds - when the mother's life is at risk, when the fetus will not survive the pregnancy, and in the case of rape.

References

External links

 
  This article incorporates text from the Library of Congress of Chile available under the CC BY 3.0 CL license.

1963 births
Amplitude (political party) politicians
Chilean Jews
Gabriela Mistral University alumni
Living people
Members of the Senate of Chile
National Renewal (Chile) politicians
Politicians from Santiago
Women members of the Senate of Chile
20th-century Chilean politicians
20th-century Chilean women politicians
21st-century Chilean politicians
21st-century Chilean women politicians
Members of the Chamber of Deputies of Chile
Women members of the Chamber of Deputies of Chile